Strel is a surname. Notable people with the surname include:

 Boris Strel (1959–2013), Slovenian alpine skier
 Martin Strel (born 1954), Slovenian long-distance swimmer